Gregory Junior (born June 21, 1999) is an American football cornerback for the Jacksonville Jaguars of the National Football League (NFL). He played college football at Ouachita Baptist.

College career 
Junior played college football at Ouachita Baptist. During his senior season in 2021, he recorded 46 tackles, 3 tackles for loss, and seven pass breakups.

Professional career
Junior was selected in the sixth round of the 2022 NFL Draft by the Jacksonville Jaguars, becoming the first player to be drafted to the NFL from Ouachita Baptist. He was waived on August 30 and signed to the practice squad the next day. He was promoted to the active roster on December 19.

References

External links
Jacksonville Jaguars bio
Ouachita Baptist Tigers bio

Living people
Ouachita Baptist Tigers football players
People from Crossett, Arkansas
Players of American football from Arkansas
Jacksonville Jaguars players
1999 births
American football cornerbacks